Kesta Styppiotes or Stypeiotes (died 11 September 883) was briefly the Domestic of the Schools of  the Byzantine Empire in ca. 883.

His surname points to an origin in the town of Stypion (modern Štip), while his first name is evidence of a Slavic or Bulgar ethnic origin. In 883, he succeeded the disgraced Andrew the Scythian as Domestic of the Schools (commander-in-chief of the Byzantine army). Andrew's disgrace has been variously attributed to the falling out between Emperor Basil I the Macedonian and his heir Leo VI the Wise at the time, with Andrew being accused as a partisan of Leo, or to accusations of timidity against the Arabs of Tarsus and failing to exploit a victory he had won against them. 

Kesta took to the field against the Arabs himself, but his negligent leadership allowed the Tarsians, under Yazaman al-Khadim, to surprise and overwhelm the Byzantine camp in a night attack. According to al-Tabari (who erroneously mentions Andrew as commander of the Byzantines) this took place on 11 September 883, and the Byzantine army was decimated: Arab chroniclers, with considerable exaggeration, report that 70,000 out of 100,000 Byzantine troops were killed, and that Kesta, along with the strategoi of the Anatolic Theme and of Cappadocia fell in the field, with the commander of Koron fortress barely being able to escape, despite his heavy injuries. Following this debacle, Andrew the Scythian was re-appointed as Domestic of the Schools. 

It is probable that captives from this disaster were among the Byzantines ransomed in the prisoner exchange of February 884, while eighty years later, when Tarsus fell to the Byzantines, Emperor Nikephoros II Phokas recovered the seven gold and silver crosses taken by Yazaman.

References

Sources 
 
 
 
 

Date of birth unknown
883 deaths
9th-century Byzantine military personnel
Domestics of the Schools
Byzantine people of the Arab–Byzantine wars
Byzantines killed in battle
Byzantine people of Slavic descent
People from Štip